Panino is the name of several inhabited localities in Russia.

Modern localities

Amur Oblast
As of 2010, one rural locality in Amur Oblast bears this name:
Panino, Amur Oblast, a selo in Paninsky Rural Settlement of Oktyabrsky District

Ivanovo Oblast
As of 2010, four rural localities in Ivanovo Oblast bear this name:
Panino (Paninskoye Rural Settlement), Furmanovsky District, Ivanovo Oblast, a village in Furmanovsky District; municipally, a part of Paninskoye Rural Settlement of that district
Panino (Ivankovskoye Rural Settlement), Furmanovsky District, Ivanovo Oblast, a village in Furmanovsky District; municipally, a part of Ivankovskoye Rural Settlement of that district
Panino, Pestyakovsky District, Ivanovo Oblast, a village in Pestyakovsky District
Panino, Savinsky District, Ivanovo Oblast, a village in Savinsky District

Kostroma Oblast
As of 2010, six rural localities in Kostroma Oblast bear this name:
Panino, Buysky District, Kostroma Oblast, a village in Tsentralnoye Settlement of Buysky District
Panino, Chernopenskoye Settlement, Kostromskoy District, Kostroma Oblast, a village in Chernopenskoye Settlement of Kostromskoy District
Panino, Kuzmishchenskoye Settlement, Kostromskoy District, Kostroma Oblast, a village in Kuzmishchenskoye Settlement of Kostromskoy District
Panino, Nerekhtsky District, Kostroma Oblast, a village in Prigorodnoye Settlement of Nerekhtsky District
Panino (settlement), Ponazyrevsky District, Kostroma Oblast, a settlement under the administrative jurisdiction of Ponazyrevo Urban Settlement of Ponazyrevsky District
Panino (village), Ponazyrevsky District, Kostroma Oblast, a village under the administrative jurisdiction of Ponazyrevo Urban Settlement of Ponazyrevsky District

Lipetsk Oblast
As of 2010, one rural locality in Lipetsk Oblast bears this name:
Panino, Lipetsk Oblast, a selo in Paninsky Selsoviet of Dobrovsky District

Moscow Oblast
As of 2010, four rural localities in Moscow Oblast bear this name:
Panino, Chekhovsky District, Moscow Oblast, a village under the administrative jurisdiction of the work settlement of Stolbovaya in Chekhovsky District
Panino, Mozhaysky District, Moscow Oblast, a village in Zamoshinskoye Rural Settlement of Mozhaysky District
Panino, Ramensky District, Moscow Oblast, a village in Ganusovskoye Rural Settlement of Ramensky District
Panino, Yegoryevsky District, Moscow Oblast, a village in Savvinskoye Rural Settlement of Yegoryevsky District

Nizhny Novgorod Oblast
As of 2010, one rural locality in Nizhny Novgorod Oblast bears this name:
Panino, Nizhny Novgorod Oblast, a selo in Paninsky Selsoviet of Sosnovsky District

Perm Krai
As of 2010, one rural locality in Perm Krai bears this name:
Panino, Perm Krai, a village in Kosinsky District

Pskov Oblast
As of 2010, one rural locality in Pskov Oblast bears this name:
Panino, Pskov Oblast, a village in Opochetsky District

Ryazan Oblast
As of 2010, one rural locality in Ryazan Oblast bears this name:
Panino, Ryazan Oblast, a selo in Paninsky Rural Okrug of Spassky District

Tambov Oblast
As of 2010, one rural locality in Tambov Oblast bears this name:
Panino, Tambov Oblast, a village in Troitskoroslyaysky Selsoviet of Tokaryovsky District

Tula Oblast
As of 2010, one rural locality in Tula Oblast bears this name:
Panino, Tula Oblast, a selo in Podosinovsky Rural Okrug of Kireyevsky District

Tver Oblast
As of 2014, four rural localities in Tver Oblast bear this name:
Panino, Burashevskoye Rural Settlement, Kalininsky District, Tver Oblast, a village in Burashevskoye Rural Settlement of Kalininsky District
Panino, Slavnovskoye Rural Settlement, Kalininsky District, Tver Oblast, a village in Slavnovskoye Rural Settlement of Kalininsky District
Panino, Rzhevsky District, Tver Oblast, a village in Uspenskoye Rural Settlement of Rzhevsky District
Panino, Selizharovsky District, Tver Oblast, a village in Selishchenskoye Rural Settlement of Selizharovsky District

Vologda Oblast
As of 2010, one rural locality in Vologda Oblast bears this name:
Panino, Vologda Oblast, a village in Andreyevsky Selsoviet of Vashkinsky District

Voronezh Oblast
As of 2010, one urban locality in Voronezh Oblast bears this name:
Panino, Voronezh Oblast, a work settlement under the administrative jurisdiction of Paninskoye Urban Settlement of Paninsky District

Yaroslavl Oblast
As of 2010, four rural localities in Yaroslavl Oblast bear this name:
Panino, Danilovsky District, Yaroslavl Oblast, a village in Vakhtinsky Rural Okrug of Danilovsky District
Panino, Gavrilov-Yamsky District, Yaroslavl Oblast, a village in Stoginsky Rural Okrug of Gavrilov-Yamsky District
Panino, Pervomaysky District, Yaroslavl Oblast, a village in Prechistensky Rural Okrug of Pervomaysky District
Panino, Tutayevsky District, Yaroslavl Oblast, a village in Fominsky Rural Okrug of Tutayevsky District

Renamed localities
Panino, name of Maloye Panino, a village in Selishchenskoye Rural Settlement of Selizharovsky District in Tver Oblast, until April 2014